Ash Koley is a Canadian new wave/alternative pop band from Winnipeg, Manitoba. The band consists of Ash Koley (lead singer), after whom the band is named, and Phil Deschambault (guitar, keyboard).

History
Ashley Michelle Koley was born in Winnipeg, Manitoba. She graduated from Miles MacDonell Collegiate and graduated with her Bachelor of Science in Biochemistry at the University of Winnipeg. During her childhood she studied dance and musical theater. She began formal singing lessons at the age of 5. During her high school years she sang with the group Prodigy, an advanced placed singing group led by producer/songwriter, Zane Zalis. Koley also sang with the Winnipeg-based ABBA tribute group Super Trooper.

Phil Deschambault is an established songwriter, producer, and artist who grew up in Russell, Manitoba. Phil has been a singer/songwriter and guitarist in numerous bands in Winnipeg including Jonah Stone, Not Going to Vegas, and Vanderveen.

Koley and Deschambault met in 2004. The band has stated that Phil was looking for a singer that could complement his style of songwriting, and had immediate chemistry with Koley when the two were introduced to one another by a mutual acquaintance. Glen Willows, founder of Burning Circus Management, signed Ash Koley (the band) to his management company and began to distribute some rough demos of the band, resulting in significant interest from several North American and European publishers. The demos also received interest from Nettwerk Records CEO Terry McBride, who signed the duo in 2009.

Musical influences
Ash Koley has been described as a mix of pop, alternative, and new wave music. The duo have listed a wide range of musical influences, including ABBA, Elton John, The Eurythmics, Annie Lennox, Peter Gabriel, Frank Sinatra, The Cardigans, Prince, Erasure, Imogen Heap, The Pretenders, Scissor Sisters, The Cure, Stevie Wonder, Depeche Mode, Queen, Blondie, Heart, Michael Jackson, Radiohead, and Phoenix.

Music
Ash Koley have released four EPs since their inception: White, Black, Red and Blue. The band began to achieve its greatest mainstream success with the release of their single "Don't Let Your Feet Touch Ground", which reached the top 50 of the Canadian Hot 100.  The song was released as a result of a significant growth in popularity due to the exposure it received after being featured on a Lotto 6/49 Canadian Television advertisement. "Don't Let Your Feet Touch Ground" was also featured in performances on the U.S. television show So You Think You Can Dance, on the lobby soundtrack of the Westin chain of hotels, and gained even more exposure after it was used during the broadcast of the 2010 Winter Olympics being held in Vancouver, British Columbia. The song is also used in 2010 UK television adverts for Tombola in semi-exclusive sponsorship of ITV's Emmerdale.  Ash Koley's music was also featured in the soundtrack for the Paris Hilton movie The Hottie and the Nottie.

A full-length album release on Nettwerk Records, Inventions, was released in 2010.

The song "Brighter at Night" is featured in a GlobalTV advertisement.

Discography

Studio albums

Remix albums

Extended plays

Singles

References

External links
Ash Koley's Official Website
Ash Koley on Facebook
Ash Koley on Twitter
Burning Circus Management

Canadian pop musicians
Living people
Canadian women rock singers
Musicians from Winnipeg
Year of birth missing (living people)
21st-century Canadian women singers
Nettwerk Music Group artists